Zuo Baogui (1837, Shandong Province – 1894, Pyongyang) was a Hui Muslim general of the Qing Dynasty who fought in the First Sino-Japanese War. He was killed in action during the Battle of Pyongyang in 1894. It was reported that the Muslim troops under his command fought well until his death in an artillery strike. A memorial was later constructed in his honor.

Sources

References

Books
 

1837 births
1894 deaths
Chinese Muslim generals
Generals from Shandong
Hui people
Qing dynasty generals
Qing military personnel killed in action
Chinese military personnel of the First Sino-Japanese War